William Henry Babcock (1849–1922) was an American author and poet.

Babcock graduated from the Columbian University Law School, worked as a journalist, and practised law in Washington D.C. Aside from several collections of poetry, he wrote historical novels and works.

Works

The Two Lost Centuries of Britain (Philadelphia: J.B. Lippincott Co., 1890)Cypress Beach (Washington: W.H. Babcock, 1890)Cian of the Chariots (Boston: Lothrop Publishing Company, 1898)
 The Tower of Wye: A Romance (Philadelphia: H. T. Coates & Co., 1901)Kent Fort Manor: A Novel (Philadelphia: Henry T. Coates, 1903)Early Norse Visits to North America  Legendary Islands of the Atlantic: A Study in Medieval Geography, New York: American Geographical Society, 1922

PoetryLord Stirling's Stand, and Other Poems (Philadelphia: J.B. Lippincott & Co., 1880)Lays from Over the Sea (London: W. Stewart & Co., 1882)Legends of the New World (Boston: R. G. Badger, 1919)

References

 William Henry Babcock at Strangers to Us All: Lawyers and Poetry''

1849 births
1922 deaths
19th-century American writers
20th-century American poets
19th-century American lawyers